Notorious means well known for a negative trait, characteristic, or action. It may also refer to:

Arts, entertainment, and media

Films
Notorious (1946 film), a thriller directed by Alfred Hitchcock
Notorious (1992 film), a TV film remake of the 1946 film, directed by Colin Bucksey
Notorious (2009 film), a biopic about The Notorious B.I.G. (Biggie Smalls)

Literature
Notorious (novel), second book in The It Girl series (2006)
Notorious, romance novel by Iris Johansen (1990)
Notorious, autobiography by Raphael Rowe (2021)
 Notorious, a novel by Gordon Korman (2021)

Music

Operas
Notorious (opera), an opera by Hans Gefors based on Alfred Hitchcock 1946 film

Albums
Notorious (Adelitas Way album), 2017
Notorious (Buried in Verona album)
Notorious (Confederate Railroad album)
Notorious (Donald D album)
Notorious (Duran Duran album)
Notorious (Joan Jett album), 1991
Notorious (soundtrack), the OST to the 2009 film

Songs
"Notorious" (Duran Duran song), 1986 single by Duran Duran
"Notorious" (The Saturdays song), from the 2011 album On Your Radar
"Notorious" (Loverboy song), a song by Loverboy from the 1987 album Wildside

Television
Notorious (2004 TV series), an American documentary series
Notorious (2016 TV series), an American drama series
"Notorious" (The Best Years episode)

Other uses
Notorious Motorcycle Club (Australia), a pseudo-motorcycle gang in Sydney, Australia
Notorious Motorcycle Club (Germany), an outlaw motorcycle club
Notorious (ship), a 2012 replica 15th century caravel

See also
Notoriety (1922 film), an American silent film
Notoriety (2013 film), an Iranian movie
The Notorious B.I.G. (1972–1997), American hip hop artist
"Notorious", Conor McGregor's nickname